Araniella is a genus of orb-weaver spiders first described by R. V. Chamberlin & Wilton Ivie in 1942.

Species
 it contains twelve species:
Araniella alpica (L. Koch, 1869) – Europe, Turkey, Caucasus, Russia (Europe to Western Siberia), Iran?
Araniella coreana Namkung, 2002 – Korea
Araniella cucurbitina (Clerck, 1757) – Europe, Turkey, Russia (Europe) to Central Asia, China, Korea
Araniella displicata (Hentz, 1847) – North America, Europe, Russia (Europe to Far East), Kazakhstan, China, Korea, Japan
Araniella inconspicua (Simon, 1874) – Europe, Turkey, Russia (Europe to Far East), Central Asia, China, Iran?
Araniella jilinensis Yin & Zhu, 1994 – China
Araniella levii Zamani & Marusik, 2020 – India
Araniella maasdorpi Zamani & Marusik, 2020 – India
Araniella maderiana (Kulczyński, 1905) – Canary Is., Madeira
Araniella mithra Zamani, Marusik & Šestáková, 2020 – Iran
Araniella nigromaculata (Schenkel, 1963) – China
Araniella nympha (Simon, 1889) – Pakistan, India, China
Araniella opisthographa (Kulczyński, 1905) – Europe, Turkey, Caucasus, Russia (Europe) to Central Asia, Iran
Araniella plicata Mi & Peng, 2016 – China
Araniella proxima (Kulczyński, 1885) – North America, Europe, Russia (Europe to Far East), Turkey, Kazakhstan
Araniella robusta Lee, Yoo & Kim, 2021 – Korea
Araniella villanii Zamani, Marusik & Šestáková, 2020 – Iran, Kazakhstan, India
Araniella yaginumai Tanikawa, 1995 – Russia (South Siberia to Far East), Korea, China, Taiwan, Japan

References

 
Araneomorphae genera
Taxa named by Ralph Vary Chamberlin
Taxa named by Wilton Ivie